The Codex Totomixtlahuaca or Codex Condumex is a colonial-era map produced on a large piece of cotton. The map represents Totomixlahuaca, Mexico, and includes a creation date of 1564. It documents a meeting over a land conflict in communities of the current Mexican state of Guerrero.

Description 
The Codex Totomixtlahuaca was found in the community of Totomixtlahuaca, located in the southeast of Guerrero, in Mexico. Using Aztec pictographs, the map represents the distribution of lands in 1564.

Preparation 
The map was drawn on a large piece of cotton, roughly 217 cm by 185 cm. It was painted with coal.

References

See also 
Mesoamerican literature

External links 
 Technical index card in Centre of Studies of History of Mexico.

Aztec codices
1560s in Mexico
Mexican documents
Aztec society
Maps of the history of the Americas
Problem solving
16th-century maps and globes